USS Delphinus (AF-24) was built in 1915 as  by Workman Clark and Co., Ltd., Belfast, Northern Ireland; acquired by the U.S. Navy 11 August 1942; and commissioned the same day as San Mateo. She was assigned the name Delphinus on 22 August 1942.

World War II Pacific operations 
Departing San Francisco, California, 12 September 1942, Delphinus arrived at Auckland, New Zealand, 4 October. She operated from this base until the end of 1945, carrying chilled and frozen provisions to forward bases in the South Pacific and to the Society, Fiji, and Samoan Islands.

After calling at Manila in January 1946, Delphinus sailed for the west coast, arriving at San Francisco, California, 23 February. For a brief period she carried cargo along the west coast and to Pearl Harbor, then sailed to New Orleans, Louisiana.

End-of-War Decommissioning 
Delphinus was decommissioned on 8 May 1946 in New Orleans, and was delivered to the War Shipping Administration the same day.

References 

 NavSource Online: Service Ship Photo Archive AF-24 Delphinus

Ships built in Belfast
1915 ships
Stores ships of the United States Navy
World War II auxiliary ships of the United States